DWTR-TV is a commercial relay television station owned and operated by GMA Network Inc. Its transmitter is located at Triple Peak, Sta. Maria, Tablas, Romblon.

GMA TV-7 Romblon programs
Balitang Southern Tagalog

References

See also
 List of GMA Network stations

GMA Network stations
Television channels and stations established in 1998
Television stations in Romblon